The Taft–West Warehouse, also known as the C.C. Taft Company Building, Plumb Supply Company, Ben's Furniture Warehouse, and Nacho Mamma's, is a historic building located in Des Moines, Iowa, United States.  Completed in 1923, this three-story brick structure was built during a transitional period between the dominance of railroads the emergence of trucks servicing warehouses.  It was designed by local architectural firm of Vorse, Kraetsch, & Kraetsch.  It features cleans lines of the Commercial style as opposed to the fussiness of late Victorian styling that was dominant in a great deal of the city's commercial architecture.  The building was also located in the Court Avenue wholesale district, and now it is only one of only five or six that remain extant. The building was constructed for the C.C. Taft Company.  This firm and the O.B. West Company that succeeded it in this building, dealt in wholesale fruits, vegetables, candy and tobacco.  The building was listed on the National Register of Historic Places in 2006.

References

Industrial buildings completed in 1923
Buildings and structures in Des Moines, Iowa
National Register of Historic Places in Des Moines, Iowa
Industrial buildings and structures on the National Register of Historic Places in Iowa
Commercial architecture in Iowa
Chicago school architecture in Iowa